Abdul Qadir Jeelani (born Gary Cole; February 10, 1954 – August 3, 2016) was an American professional basketball player. Born in Bells, Tennessee, he was a 6'8" and 210 lb small forward and played college basketball at the University of Wisconsin–Parkside. He had a brief career in the National Basketball Association (NBA).

Jeelani is University of Wisconsin–Parkside's career leader in points scored (2,262) and rebounds (1,237) and he holds records in the top four of seven other single-game, single-season and career statistical categories. He twice scored 47 points in a game, one of the top records for a single game scoring performance. He was a member of two NAIA National Tournament teams in 1974 and 1975 and was named an NAIA All-American in 1975 and 1976. He attended Washington Park High School in Racine, Wisconsin.

Jeelani was drafted on June 8, 1976, by the NBA's Cleveland Cavaliers in the third round of the 1976 draft, and he was waived in October of that year. Later he was signed by the Detroit Pistons on September 2, 1977, but was again waived a month later, prior to the start of the 1977-78 season. He played one season with the Portland Trail Blazers in 1979–80 and was made available in the expansion draft on May 28, 1980, where he was taken by the Dallas Mavericks prior to their inaugural season in 1980–81. He was part of the starting lineup for the Mavericks' first NBA game in 1980 and scored the first points in franchise history. In his first season with the Mavs, he seemed to have a knack for scoring in the final quarter of games. As of January 20, 1981, when he had played 43 games, 142 of his 350 points had come in the last period.

Jeelani also had a career overseas playing in Italy, in Lazio Basket and Libertas Livorno and Spain.

Jeelani died on August 3, 2016, at Wheaton Franciscan All-Saints hospital in Racine.

Notes

External links 
 NBA stats at basketball-reference.com
 Photo of Abdul Jeelani playing for the Dallas Mavericks at mavswiki.com

1954 births
2016 deaths
African-American basketball players
African-American Muslims
American expatriate basketball people in Italy
American expatriate basketball people in Spain
American men's basketball players
Askatuak SBT players
Basketball players from Tennessee
Basketball players from Wisconsin
Real Betis Baloncesto players
Cleveland Cavaliers draft picks
Converts to Islam
Dallas Mavericks expansion draft picks
Dallas Mavericks players
Liga ACB players
People from Crockett County, Tennessee
Portland Trail Blazers players
Saski Baskonia players
Small forwards
Sportspeople from Racine, Wisconsin
Wisconsin–Parkside Rangers men's basketball players
20th-century African-American sportspeople
21st-century African-American people